Liberty City is a neighborhood in Miami, Florida, United States.  The area is roughly bound by NW 79th Street to the north, NW 27th Avenue to the west, the Airport Expressway to the South, and Interstate 95 to the east. The neighborhood is home to one of the largest concentrations of African Americans in South Florida, as of the 2000 census. Although it was often known as "Model City" both historically and by the City of Miami government, residents more commonly call it Liberty City.

It is serviced by the Miami Metrorail at Dr. Martin Luther King Jr. Plaza and Brownsville stations along NW 27th Avenue.

History
Once part of the sparsely populated outskirts of northern Miami, what became Liberty City developed during the Great Depression of the 1930s when President Franklin D. Roosevelt authorized the construction of the Liberty Square housing project in 1933, the first of its kind in the Southern United States. Built as a response to the deteriorating housing conditions in densely populated and covenant-restricted slums of Overtown, construction on the initial housing project began in 1934 and it opened in 1937.

Into the 1940s and 1950s, the growing Liberty City and adjacent Brownsville thrived as a middle-income black American community, hosting several churches, hospitals, and community centers. The area served as home to prominent figures such as Kelsey Pharr, M. Athalie Range (the first black American elected to serve on the Miami city commission) and boxer Muhammad Ali. Although segregation laws prohibited black Americans from resting and residing in popular Miami Beach, service establishment and resorts such as the Hampton House Motel and Villas catered to and entertained the likes of notables such as Martin Luther King Jr., Althea Gibson, and even whites such as Mickey Mantle.

Construction of Interstate 95 in Florida in Overtown and declining use of restrictive covenants in the wake of the Civil Rights Act of 1964 dramatically altered the neighborhood into the 1960s. Increasing numbers of lower-income elderly and welfare-dependent families migrated to Liberty City after their displacement primarily from inner city Overtown, turning the area into a dangerous ghetto, leading to large-scale black flight of middle- and higher-income blacks and other blacks like West Indian Americans largely to suburban areas like Florida City and Miami Gardens in southern and northern Dade County, respectively.

Crime grew prevalent in the increasingly poverty-stricken area in the immediate post–civil rights movement era of the 1960s and 1970s. The ensuing problems of the poor and disenfranchised grew most apparent and notable in race riots that occurred in Liberty City in August 1968 during the Republican National Convention in Miami Beach, and in May 1980 following the acquittal of police officers charged with the killing of Arthur McDuffie

The plight of inner-city black Miamians increasingly came to be highlighted in national press into the 1980s as the University of Miami Hurricanes football team won several national college football championships led by players recruited mostly from black, lower-income neighborhoods such as Liberty City and Overtown. National exposure continued with the popularity of nationally broadcast programs such as the NBC crime drama Miami Vice, which brought the deteriorating conditions of the area to greater prominence.

Into the 1990s and 2000s, music grew to reflect the area, with locals such as Luther Campbell of 2 Live Crew pioneering the Miami bass genre, which dominated Southern hip hop during the decade. Other music and sports talents rose to national prominence from the area such as rappers Trina and Trick Daddy and NFL players Chad "Ocho Cinco" Johnson, Antonio Brown, and Willis McGahee.

Gentrification 
Climate change is  affecting the value of flood-prone real estate in Miami.  Miami neighborhoods with higher elevations such as Liberty City are experiencing increasing real estate values. By 2017, Liberty City, along with Little Haiti, started becoming more attractive to investors. A community land trust is planned to maintain affordability for current residents. Home prices appreciated more slowly in 2018 in Miami Beach and lower-elevation areas of Miami-Dade County.

Demographics
In 2000, Liberty City had a population of 23,009 and 43,054 residents, with 7,772 households, and 5,428 families residing in the neighborhood. The median household income was $18,809.87. The racial makeup of the neighborhood was 94.69% Black, 3.04% Hispanic or Latino of any nationality, 1.68% Other races (non-Hispanic), and 0.59% White.

The zip codes for the Liberty City include 33127, 33142, 33147, and 33150. In 2000, there were 19,286 males and 23,768 females. The median age for males was 25.9 years, while the median age for females was 30.3 years. The average household size had 3.1 people, while the average family size had 3.7 members. The percentage of married-couple families (among all households) was 20.3%, while the percentage of married-couple families with children (among all households) was 9.1%, and the percentage of single-mother households (among all households) was 33.1%. The percentage of never-married males 15 years old and over was 21.9%, while the percentage of never-married females 15 years old and over was 29.7%.

In 2000, 2.7% of the population spoke little to no English. The percentage of residents born in Florida was 74.5%, the percentage of people born in another U.S. state was 16.7%, and the percentage of native residents but born outside the U.S. was 0.8%, while the percentage of foreign born residents was 7.9%.

Education 
Miami-Dade County Public Schools operates area public schools:

Public Schools

Elementary schools
Lillie C. Evans K-8 Center
Poinciana Park Elementary School
Liberty City Elementary School
Holmes Elementary School
Charles R. Drew K-8 Center
Agenoria S. Paschal/Olinda Elementary School
Orchard Villa Elementary School
Lenora Braynon Smith Elementary School
Kelsey L. Pharr Elementary School
Earlington Heights Elementary School
Shadowlawn Elementary School
Thena B. Crowder Elementary School

Middle schools
Brownsville Middle School
Charles R. Drew K-8 Center
Lillie C. Evans K-8 Center

High schools
Miami Northwestern Senior High School
Miami Central Senior High School

Colleges
Miami Dade College

Libraries
Miami-Dade Public Library operates area public libraries:
Model City Library

Transportation
The Miami Metrorail services the neighborhood at the following stations:
   Earlington Heights (Airport Expressway and West 22nd Avenue)
  Brownsville (North 52nd Street and West 27th Avenue)
  Dr. Martin Luther King Jr. Plaza (North 62nd Street/Martin Luther King Jr. Blvd and West 27th Avenue)

Notable people

Barry Jenkins
Ian Richards
Wilkie D. Ferguson, Jr.
M. Athalie Range
Leslie C. Brown, motivational speaker 
Carrie P. Meek
Luther Campbell
Ky-mani Marley
Darlyne Chauve
Udonis Haslem
Mickey Rourke
Tarell Alvin McCraney, playwright
Montel Vontavious Porter
Trick Daddy
Trina
JT, member of American rap duo City Girls
Chad Johnson, NFL wide receiver
Bershawn Jackson
Rakeem Cato
Jacki-O
Darnell Jenkins
Betty Wright
Marcus Forston
Jacory Harris
Sean Spence, NFL linebacker
Teddy Bridgewater, NFL quarterback
John Marks, Mayor of Tallahassee
DJ Uncle Al
George Jung-lived in Liberty City in 1987 which was shown in the movie Blow
Rakeem Cato, CFL quarterback
Elvis Dumervil, linebacker for the Baltimore Ravens of the NFL
Antonio Brown, NFL wide receiver
Artie Burns, NFL cornerback for the Pittsburgh Steelers
Amari Cooper, NFL wide receiver for the Dallas Cowboys
Eli Rogers, NFL wide receiver for the Pittsburgh Steelers
T. Y. Hilton, NFL wide receiver for the Indianapolis Colts
Devonta Freeman, NFL Running back Atlanta Falcons
Purvis Young, self-taught visual artist
Erica Wheeler, WNBA Player

See also
Liberty City Riots
Liberty Square
Miami Workers Center
Nation of Yahweh
New Covenant Presbyterian Church of Miami

References

Further reading

External links

"Photo Essay: Fitting Tribute by Hank Willis Thomas", Mother Jones, May 2007

1930s establishments in Florida
African-American history in Miami
Neighborhoods in Miami
Populated places established in the 1930s